Surya Narayanapuram is a village in Annamayya district of the Indian state of Andhra Pradesh. It is located in Ramapuram mandal of Rayachoti revenue division

References 

Villages in Kadapa district